The Los Gatos Daily News, now called the Los Gatos News was a free newspaper in Los Gatos, California published 3 days a week. The newspaper was founded May 15, 2002 by Dave Price (journalist) and Jim Pavelich, who also published the Palo Alto Daily News. Both papers were distributed in newspaper racks and in stores, coffee shops, restaurants, schools and major workplaces. The Los Gatos News, along with five other editions, was sold to Knight Ridder on Feb. 15, 2005.

The 30,000-person community of Los Gatos was served by four primary newspapers: the Los Gatos Observer, the San Jose Mercury News, the Los Gatos News, and the Los Gatos Weekly Times. All except the online-only Los Gatos Observer were briefly owned by the non-local McClatchy company after McClatchy's acquisition of Knight Ridder in early 2006, and are now controlled by MediaNews Group of Denver, Colorado.

The paper was closed on September 9, 2007.

External links
 Los Gatos News online
 Knight Ridder buys Daily News
 Daily News publishers ride into sunset

MediaNews Group publications
Daily newspapers published in the San Francisco Bay Area
Free daily newspapers
Publications established in 2002
Publications disestablished in 2007
2002 establishments in California
2007 disestablishments in California
Defunct newspapers published in California
Los Gatos, California